San Jose, officially the Municipality of San Jose,  is a 1st class municipality in the province of Batangas, Philippines. According to the 2020 census, it has a population of 79,868 people.

The municipality is bounded in the north and north-east by Lipa, east by Ibaan, south by Batangas City and San Pascual, and west by Cuenca and Alitagtag.

History 
The Aetas were the first inhabitants of the place. They started clearing some portions of the wilderness especially in areas near the riverbanks. Several groups of settlers then drove this Aetas to the hinterlands and permanently occupied the place. They named it “Malaquing Tubig” which literally translates to "big river" referring to body of water that cuts through the central portion of their early settlement.

The Spaniards then colonized the Philippines in 1565. Bauan was established in 1596 as an ecclesiastical unit administered by the order of Saint Agustin with Malaquing Tubig as one of the barrios under its jurisdiction.

Human population of Malaquing Tubig started to grow and in 1754, Taal Volcano erupted destroying the original Bauan. And before its actual site could have been selected, Malaking Tubig was separated from Bauan. The recognized leaders of Malaquing Tubig then petitioned to the Spanish authorities for the creation of that place as a pueblo which was granted to them on April 26, 1765.

Established on April 26, 1765, as the town of San José de Malaquing Tubig, it once formed part of Bauan, and in the new town's establishment, it originally included the land that now makes up the Municipality of Cuenca.

Geography

According to the Philippine Statistics Authority, the municipality has a land area of  constituting  of the  total area of Batangas.

Barangays
San Jose is politically subdivided into 33 barangays.

Climate

Demographics

In the 2020 census, San Jose had a population of 79,868.

Economy

Government

List of former Municipal Executives

Although currently called "Mayor", the Municipal Executive of San Jose has held other names including Gobernadorcillo which means "Governor" during the Spanish Period.

Economy
San Jose is well known for growing good varieties of coffee, lanzones, and black pepper. It is where a great number of poultry and piggery animals are grown and sold, especially to Metro Manila, where it supplies a significant percentage of poultry products. Most of the San Jose workforce is either directly or indirectly involved in farming. There are also numerous feedmill corporations within its jurisdiction which include WhiteGold, Everlast, Busilac, Wincom, New Golden Mix.

Tourism

The Shrine of Saint Joseph the Patriarch located in the town proper is a popular Catholic pilgrimage site. It was once built with cogon and bamboo by Augustinian friars around 1788. The present structure was built on 1812 under the supervision of a botanist Fr. Manuel Blanco. It has single-aisled interior which offers an unobstructed view of the large main altar. The altar is massive, with six rounded columns encircling the image of Saint Joseph. Outside a multi-tiered belfry stands which was built in the latter part of the 19th century; a bridge offers passage to the church over the Malaquing Tubig River.

San Jose is also home to the Oblates of Saint Joseph Mission and its Minor Seminary, founded by the Saint Joseph Marello. The Oblates were the first Italian congregation to send missionaries to the Philippines. San Jose became their first foreign mission, and is the center of the Vicariate X of the Archdiocese of Lipa.

San Jose celebrates Sinuam Festival every 25th day of April to commemorate its founding anniversary and to thank its patron for the good performance of the main business in the town which is Poultry.

Notable personalities 

 Querube C. Makalintal – Chief Justice of The Supreme Court (1973–1976), Speaker of the Batasang Pambansa (1978–1984) and Solicitor General (1954).
 Jose C. Aguila – Division Superintendent of Schools (Abra, Nueva Vizcaya, La Union, Laguna, Pampanga, Batangas and Iloilo), first Filipino principal of Ilocos Norte National High School, Military Governor of Nueva Vizcaya in 1942 (Lt. Col. in the Fil-Am Guerilla Unit, USAFFE), served as a municipal treasurer in retirement. Assigned many San Jose residents to teaching posts in the various provinces he administered as superintendent for over twenty years.

References

External links 

[ Philippine Standard Geographic Code]

Municipalities of Batangas